The Adler Papyri designates a collection of papyri established by Lord Elkan Nathan Adler during his visits to Egypt. The majority of the papyri belonged to the archive of Horos son of Nechoutes which he reportedly acquired in 1924, but the collection also included documents from the archive of Panas son of Espemetis and a few other items. Fifty-one of the papyri were published in a volume entitled The Adler Papyri. The published papyri are now in the Papyrus Carlsberg Collection at the University of Copenhagen.

Bibliography

External links
The Papyrus Carlsberg Collection

Greek-language papyri
Egyptian papyri